Tipatipa is a typical of Batak snack from Porsea, Toba Samosir, North Sumatra.

The shape is rather loud and comes from specially selected rice to make tipatipa.

References
 rosa manalu

Batak cuisine